Marcello: A Sweet Life is a 2006 Italian documentary film about actor Marcello Mastroianni.

References

External links

2006 films
Italian documentary films
2000s Italian-language films
2000s Italian films